Circumstance is a 1922 Australian silent film directed by Lawson Harris.

Plot
A young woman is seduced and deserted by a man. She is rescued by a wealthy novelist, who wants to write a story about her life. The novelist's cousin proposes to the girl, only to realise she is the same girl he seduced and abandoned earlier in his life.

Cast
Lawson Harris as Richard Talbot
Yvonne Pavis as Hazel Dalwood
Carlton Max as Bernard St Clair
Dot Pritchard as Jenny Taylor
Irish Webster as Mrs Carson
Cane Arthur
David Edelsten
Gordon Collingridge

Production
The film was produced by two Americans, Lawson Harris and Yvonne Pavis. Harris came to Australia in 1920 to help Arthur Shirley make The Throwback and later ran an acting school. He was joined in 1922 by Pavis, who was an experienced Hollywood actor. Together they made three low budget feature films.

Reception
The Sydney Truth said the film did "sensational" business in its first week.

The film was profitable, due in part to its low cost.

References

External links

Circumstance at National Film and Sound Archive

1922 films
Australian drama films
Australian black-and-white films
Australian silent feature films
1922 drama films
Silent drama films